blackwave. (also known as blackwavedot) is a Belgian hip-hop duo composed of producer Willem Ardui and rapper Jay Walker. Their influences include The Roots, Prince, Parliament-Funkadelic and Brockhampton. The group, in an interview with Billboard, said "We love incorporating all kinds of different genres in our music and challenging ourselves to always try something different."

The band has released their first album, named Mic Check, in 2017.

In 2019, blackwave. have been nominated for the 2019 MTV Europe Music Awards in the 'Best Belgian Act' category. Other artists listed are IBE, MATTN, Tamino, and Zwangere Guy.

Their second album, Are We Still Dreaming?, released in 2019. Reaching 4th place in the Belgium Top 200 Albums.

Discography

Albums

Singles

References 

Belgian hip hop groups